The 1st constituency of Loire-Atlantique is a French legislative constituency in the Loire-Atlantique département, covering the western part of the city of Nantes. Like the other 576 French constituencies, it elects one MP using the two-round system, with a run-off if no candidate receives over 50% of the vote in the first round.

Description

From 1958 to 1986, the constituency was made up of the cantons of Nantes-1, 2 and 3.

Deputy since 2007, Francois de Rugy, was also the President of the National Assembly between 2017 and 2018.

Historic representation

Election results

2022

 
 
 
 
 
 
 
|-
| colspan="8" bgcolor="#E9E9E9"|
|-

2017

2012

2007

 
 
 
 
|-
| colspan="8" bgcolor="#E9E9E9"|
|-

2002

 
 
 
 
|-
| colspan="8" bgcolor="#E9E9E9"|
|-

1997

 
 
 
 
 
 
 
|-
| colspan="8" bgcolor="#E9E9E9"|
|-

References and Sources

 Official results of French elections from 1998: 

1